The Mountainview Colts are a junior "B" ice hockey team based in Didsbury, Alberta, Canada. They are members of the North Division of the Heritage Junior B Hockey League (HJHL). They play their home games at Didsbury Memorial Complex. The Colts celebrated their 25th anniversary season during the 2014-15 season. The team won the Heritage Junior B Hockey League Championship after the 2015–16 season.

Season-by-season record
Note: GP = Games played, W = Wins, L = Losses, T = Ties, OTL = Overtime Losses, Pts = Points, GF = Goals for, GA = Goals against, PIM = Penalties in minutes

Russ Barnes Trophy
Alberta Jr. B Provincial Championships

See also
List of ice hockey teams in Alberta

References

External links
Official website of the Mountainview Colts

Ice hockey teams in Alberta